de la Rúa is a surname. Notable people with the name include:

Antonio de la Rúa (born 1974), Argentine lawyer
Fernando de la Rúa (1937–2019), Argentine president
Jorge de la Rúa (1942–2015), Argentine government official

See also
De la Rue (surname)